The Orla is a 35 km long river in eastern Thuringia, Germany, right tributary to the river Saale. Its source is near the town Triptis. It flows west through the towns Neustadt an der Orla and Pößneck. The Orla flows into the Saale in Orlamünde, 17 km south of Jena.

See also
List of rivers of Thuringia

Rivers of Thuringia
Rivers of Germany